Mfuleni is a relatively new township about 32 kilometres from central Cape Town, South Africa. It is a predominantly Black township, although there are also some Coloured members of the community.

Mfuleni is a suburb of Blue Downs area and is close to the sprawling township of Khayelitsha and also next to the new suburb of Malibu Village. Around 52,300 people live in this township. Most were moved there from the late 1990s following flooding and fires in different townships across the Western Cape, such as Philippi, Nyanga and Khayelitsha. Hence, the mixed nature of the community here. Unemployment, HIV/AIDS and crime are some of the most pressing problems in this poor township.

Recently, the Department of Local government and Housing with its partners established a new housing project which built an additional 165 houses.

Only 43% of Mfuleni residents are employed.

References

Townships in the Western Cape
Populated places in the City of Cape Town